Abdur Rahim Ajmal (born  1 July 1986)  is an Indian politician and businessman. He is a member of the Assam Legislative Assembly for the Jamunamukh constituency.

Early life and education 
Ajmal was born on 1 July 1986 in Mumbai, Maharashtra, to a Bengali Muslim family from Hojai in central Assam. The family trace their origins to the Sylhet district of eastern Bengal. His grandfather, Haji Ajmal Ali, was a rice farmer who moved to Mumbai in 1950 to try to succeed in the perfume industry using the oud plant. After the opening of the first store in the 1960s, the Ajmal perfume brand quickly grew to become a large brand in the Middle East. Ajmal's father, Badruddin Ajmal, is the founder of the All India United Democratic Front political party and the president of the Jamiat Ulema-e-Assam.

Ajmal completed his Fazil certification from Darul Uloom Deoband in 2008.

Career 
Ajmal competed in a 2014 by-election as an All India United Democratic Front candidate for Jamunamukh, defeating Congress candidate Bashir Uddin Laskar by 22959 votes. He maintained his position following the 2016 Assam Legislative Assembly election.

References 

Living people
All India United Democratic Front politicians
Politicians from Mumbai
1986 births
Assam MLAs 2011–2016
Assam MLAs 2016–2021
21st-century Bengalis
20th-century Bengalis
Darul Uloom Deoband alumni